Ministry of Health and Sports regroups the two following ministries: Ministry of Health and Ministry of Sports.In 2016, President Htin Kyaw dissolved the Ministry of Sports (Myanmar) and organized it under the Ministry of Health.On 25 May 2016, under Htin Kyaw's Government, it was renamed to Ministry of Health and Sports, regrouping both ministries in one governing body.

On 1 August 2021, the SAC reconstituted the Ministry of Health and Sports as Ministry of Health and Ministry of Sports and Youth Affairs.

Departments
Department of Public Health
Department of Medical Services
Department of Human Resources for Health
Department of Medical Research
Department of Traditional Medicine
Department of Food and Drug Administration
Department of Sports and Physical Education

See also
 Ministry of Health
Ministry of Sports

References

External links 
 

HealthandSports